The 2017–18 North Carolina Tar Heels women's basketball team will represent the University of North Carolina at Chapel Hill during the 2017–18 NCAA Division I women's basketball season. The Tar Heels, led by thirty-second year head coach Sylvia Hatchell, play their games at Carmichael Arena and were members of the Atlantic Coast Conference. They finished the season 15–16, 4–12 in ACC play in twelfth place. They defeated Boston College in the first round before losing in the second round of the ACC women's tournament to NC State.

Roster

Schedule

|-
!colspan=9 style="background:#56A0D3; color:#FFFFFF;"|Exhibition

|-
!colspan=9 style="background:#56A0D3; color:#FFFFFF;"| Non-conference regular season

|-
!colspan=9 style="background:#56A0D3; color:#FFFFFF;"| ACC regular season

|-
!colspan=9 style="background:#56A0D3;"| ACC Women's Tournament

Source

Rankings

See also
2017–18 North Carolina Tar Heels men's basketball team

References

North Carolina Tar Heels women's basketball seasons
North Carolina
North Car
North Car